Immanuel Ngatjizeko (30 May 1952 – 5 March 2022) was a Namibian politician and member of the ruling SWAPO Party. He held five ministerial portfolios from 2003 until his retirement in 2018.

Early life and education
Immanuel Ngatjizeko was born in Otjohorongo, a village near Omaruru in Namibia's central Erongo Region. He attended the Augustineum Secondary School in Windhoek and then went to study at Fort Hare in South Africa. He graduated with a Diploma in Commerce and Administration in 1976. 

After his return to South West Africa he worked at the Council of Churches in Namibia until 1994, heading its Finance Department. He then started working full time for SWAPO, first as Managing Director of its investment company Zebra Holdings, and from 1997 as party Secretary for Finance.

Political career
Ngatjizeko was a SWAPO party organiser from 1978. He served on the Internal National Executive Committee before Namibian independence. He was elected to SWAPO's Central Committee in 1991, and to the politburo in 2007. 

Ngatjizeko was a member of Parliament from 2000, and member of the Cabinet from 2003, when he was appointed Director-General of the National Planning Commission, a position equivalent to that of a minister. From 2000 to 2005, he also served as Deputy Minister of Mines and Energy. In the 2005–2010 cabinet Ngatjizeko was first Minister of Trade and Industry and from 2008 Minister of Labour and Social Welfare. In the 2010–2015 cabinet he served as Minister of Labour and Social Welfare until 2012, and as Minister of Safety and Security for the remainder of the legislative period.

Under President Hage Geingob, Ngatjizeko moved back to the post of Minister of Industrialisation, Trade and SME Development in March 2015. In a Cabinet reshuffle in February 2018 he became Minister of Presidential Affairs but resigned shortly thereafter and retired due to health issues.

Personal life
Ngatjizeko died on 5 March 2022, at the age of 69.

Awards and recognition
On Heroes' Day 2014 he was conferred the Most Brilliant Order of the Sun, Second Class.

References

1952 births
2022 deaths
People from Erongo Region
University of Fort Hare alumni
Augustineum Secondary School alumni
Members of the National Assembly (Namibia)
SWAPO politicians
Security ministers of Namibia
Labour ministers of Namibia
Trade and industry ministers of Namibia
Directors-general of the National Planning Commission of Namibia